In grammar, the illative case (abbreviated ; from  "brought in") is a grammatical case used in the Finnish, Estonian, Lithuanian, Latvian and Hungarian languages. It is one of the locative cases, and has the basic meaning of "into (the inside of)".

In Finnish
The case is formed by adding -hVn, where 'V' represents the last vowel, and then removing the 'h' if a simple long vowel would result. For example,  + Vn becomes  with a simple long 'oo'; cf.  + hVn becomes , without the elision of 'h'. This unusually complex way of adding a suffix can be explained by its reconstructed origin: a voiced palatal fricative. (Modern Finnish has lost palatalization and fricatives other than 'h' or 's'.) In some dialects spoken in Ostrobothnia, notably South Ostrobothnia, the 'h' is not removed; one says . Some dialects of Finland Proper and Kymenlaakso also have a similar feature. In some instances  is added, e.g.

The other locative cases in Finnish, Estonian and Hungarian are:
Inessive case ("in")
Elative case ("out of")
Adessive case ("on")
Allative case ("onto")
Ablative case ("from")

In Lithuanian
The illative case, denoting direction of movement, is now less common in the standard language but is common in the spoken language, especially in certain dialects. Its singular form, heard more often than the plural, appears in books, newspapers, etc. Most Lithuanian nouns can take the illative ending, indicating that from the descriptive point of view the illative still can be treated as a case in Lithuanian. Since the beginning of the 20th century it isn't included in the lists of standard Lithuanian cases in most grammar books and textbooks, and the prepositional construction į+accusative is more frequently used today to denote direction. The illative case was used extensively in older Lithuanian; the first Lithuanian grammar book, by Daniel Klein, mentions both illative and į+accusative but calls the usage of the illative "more elegant". Later, it has often appeared in the written texts of the authors who grew up in Dzukija or Eastern Aukštaitija, such as Vincas Krėvė-Mickevičius.

The illative case in Lithuanian has its own endings, which are different for each declension paradigm, although quite regular, compared with some other Lithuanian cases.

Further reading

References

External links 
 Hungarian illative case from www.HungarianReference.com

Grammatical cases